Cool Hand Lōc is the second and final studio album by American rapper Tone Lōc. It was released on November 19, 1991 via Delicious Vinyl. Production was handled by Michael Ross, Matt Dike, Tony Joseph, Quicksilver, Def Jef, Sir Jinx and Tone Loc himself, with co-production from M. Walk and William Michael Tate. It features guest appearances from Kenyatta, Def Jef, El DeBarge and MC Wink Dog. The album peaked at number 46 on the Billboard Top R&B/Hip-Hop Albums chart. Its lead single, "All Through the Night", peaked at number 80 on the Billboard Hot 100.

Critical reception

Alex Henderson of AllMusic gave the album 3 stars out of 5, calling it "a respectable and satisfying effort". Alan Light of Rolling Stone wrote, "Cool Hand Lōc includes several love songs, which are rescued from sappiness by Loc's seductive, slow-rolling delivery; these are balanced by a couple of Ice-T-style gangsta tales". James Bernard of Entertainment Weekly wrote, "Tone-Loc has a lot to prove and Cool Hand Lōc aches with this need. As raspy as ever, Loc tries to break from his party-party image and convince us that he's a product of the concrete jungle (as on the engaging, bouncy "Funky West Side") and a hustler to boot (as on the lackluster "Pimp Without a Caddy"). "Fatal Attraction" recaptures the playful storytelling and catchy hooks of "Wild Thing" and "Funky Cold Medina". But there's not much else that promises to reclaim what Loc once had: The two slow love jams he throws in will neither enhance his street image nor make an R&B-flavored romantic rapper like Heavy D".

Track listing

Charts

References

External links

1991 albums
Tone Lōc albums
Delicious Vinyl albums
Albums produced by Def Jef